In United States public schools, the practices of restraint and seclusion are not regulated on the federal level. All but four of the 50 U.S. states have regulations on portions of these practices.

Practices

Retraints are defined by the U.S. Department of Education as "a personal restriction that immobilizes or reduces the ability of a student to move his or her torso, arms, legs, or head freely".

Prone restraints are a practice where students are physically held, face-down, on the floor.

Seclusion is defined by the Department of Education as "the involuntary confinement of a student alone in a room or area from which the student is physically prevented from leaving".

Legality by state
Although these practices are not regulated at the federal level, federal guidelines suggest these practices should never be used except if a student's behavior "poses imminent danger of serious physical harm to self or others".

Connecticut
Restraint and seclusion are legal in Connecticut. The acts were recorded to have taken place tens of thousands of times per year for over a decade, especially to Black students and students with autism. A bill introduced in 2023, SB 1200, would replace seclusion with a time-out in an unlocked room and limit when restraint is allowed.

Vermont
Prone restraints are permitted in Vermont, though strictly limited. In 2022, Harwood Union Unified School District put a temporary halt to the practice while a task force would examine the district's use of the tactics.

Summary of state laws
State laws on seclusion and restraint:

References

Explanatory notes

Citations

External links
 Restraint and Seclusion, U.S. Department of Education
 Summary Table of Seclusion and Restraint Statutes, Regulations, Policies and Guidance, by State and Territories, U.S. Department of Education
 Multi-article Times Union investigation into the practices

Education controversies in the United States